Lewis Corner is an unincorporated community in Gordon County, in the U.S. state of Georgia.

History
The community was named in honor of the Lewis family of settlers.

References

Unincorporated communities in Gordon County, Georgia
Unincorporated communities in Georgia (U.S. state)